Lapino is a rural locality (a village) in Gorod Vyazniki, Vyaznikovsky District, Vladimir Oblast, Russia. The population was 65 as of 2010. There are two streets.

Geography
Pirovy-Gorodishchi is the nearest rural locality.

References

Rural localities in Vyaznikovsky District